Holiday for Sinners is a 1952 American drama film directed by Gerald Mayer and starring Gig Young, Keenan Wynn and Janice Rule.

Plot
Three men, reared together in New Orleans, but whose paths have drifted apart, each face a crisis during the last weekend of Mardi Gras: Dr. Jason Kent must decide between accepting a chance to become famous as a research scientist, which will mean leaving New Orleans and giving up the girl he loves, Susan Corvier, or staying in his father's practice among the poor; Father Victor Carducci is refused permission to open an independent clinic and is thinking of leaving the Church; punch-drunk prizefighter Joe Piavi is mainly operating in a survival mode and is trying to collect $1,500 owed to him by his former manager Mike Hennighan. When he finds out about the debt, brash reporter Danny Farber, not above a double-cross when it means gain for him, needles Hennighan about Joe, and then tells Joe that Henninghan is threatening to send him to an asylum.

Cast
 Gig Young as Dr. Jason Kent
 Keenan Wynn as Joe Piavi
 Janice Rule as Susan Corvier
 William Campbell as Danny Farber
 Richard Anderson as Father Victor Carducci
 Michael Chekhov as Dr. Konndorff
 Sandro Giglio as 	Nick Muto
 Edith Barrett as 	Mrs. Corvier
 Porter Hall as 	Louie
 Ralph Dumke as 	Mike Hennighan
 Jack Raine as 	Dr. Surtees
 Frank Dekova as the Wiry Man
 Will Wright as the Man with a Cigar

Reception

The New York Times review was mixed, but positive overall: “The error of allowing a basic situation to be dissipated in irrelevancies has resulted, as it often does, in a weakened total impression in ‘Holiday for Sinners’....Basically, Mr. Young’s trouble is that he’s beginning to doubt that the people he helps and comforts are worth the trouble. Why should he go on slipping Joe the ten spots or trying to get his eyesight restored? Shouldn’t he, as he says, ‘Let Joe take care of Joe?” His is a fundamental question, a conflict of the soul that here, at least, is never answered satisfactorily. True, he does stay on, passing up the good job, but he never gives evidence that he’s solved his problem, or answered his own questions....Keenan Wynn gives a performance as fine as you’ll see anywhere...you’ll have trouble recognizing Keenan Wynn, the comic....’Holiday for Sinners,’ while lacking solidity, is worth seeing.”

According to MGM records, the movie earned $303,000 in the U.S. and Canada and $80,000 elsewhere, resulting in a loss to the studio of $562,000.

References

External links
Holiday for Sinners a TCMDB

1952 films
Metro-Goldwyn-Mayer films
1952 drama films
American drama films
American black-and-white films
Films set in New Orleans
1950s English-language films
1950s American films